Mal Sukhteh (also Romanized as Mal Sūkhteh) is a village in Bord Khun Rural District, Bord Khun District, Deyr County, Bushehr Province, Iran. At the 2006 census, its population was 62, in 11 families.

References 

Populated places in Deyr County